The 1888 Open Championship was the 28th Open Championship, held 6 October at the Old Course at St Andrews, Fife, Scotland. Jack Burns won the Championship by a stroke from David Anderson Jr. and Ben Sayers.

Willie Campbell led after 18 holes for the third successive year and was the leader on 84 with Sayers on 85 and a group of four players on 86.

In the afternoon Sayers, in the first group, scored 87 and took an early lead on 172. Campbell made a number of mistakes and scored 90 for a total of 174. Sayers was then joined on 172 by David Anderson. Playing a few groups behind, Burns scored an 85 and took the lead on 171, a score none of the later players could match.

Burns's score for his first round had originally been added up to 87 but a Royal and Ancient Golf Club member noticed that it was added up incorrectly and the total wr&as adjusted to 86, making Burns the champion.

Final leaderboard

Source:

Saturday, 6 October 1888

Playoff
Monday, 8 October 1888

Anderson and Sayers played an 18-hole play-off two days later. Sayers won and took the second prize of £6, Anderson taking the third prize of £3.

References

External links
St Andrews 1888 (Official site)

The Open Championship
Golf tournaments in Scotland
Open Championship
Open Championship
Open Championship